The 2016 Engie Open Métropole 42 was a professional tennis tournament played on indoor hard courts. It was the sixth edition of the tournament and part of the 2016 ITF Women's Circuit, offering a total of $50,000 in prize money. It took place in Andrézieux-Bouthéon, France, on 25–31 January 2016.

Singles main draw entrants

Seeds 

 1 Rankings as of 18 January 2016.

Other entrants 
The following players received wildcards into the singles main draw:
  Myrtille Georges
  Shérazad Reix
  Caroline Roméo
  Carla Touly

The following players received entry from the qualifying draw:
  Ekaterina Alexandrova
  Alberta Brianti
  Dalila Jakupović
  Arantxa Rus

The following player received entry using a junior exempt:
  Anna Blinkova

Champions

Singles

 Stefanie Vögele def.  An-Sophie Mestach, 6–1, 6–2

Doubles

 Elise Mertens /  An-Sophie Mestach def.  Viktorija Golubic /  Xenia Knoll, 6–4, 3–6, [10–7]

External links 
 2016 Engie Open Métropole 42 at ITFtennis.com
 Official website 

2016 ITF Women's Circuit
2016 in French tennis
2016